The Finlandia Prize is a set of Finnish literary prizes awarded by the Finnish Book Foundation to "celebrate reading and highlight new Finnish first-rate literature." Considered the most prestigious in the nation, they are awarded annually in three categories: fiction, non-fiction and children's and youth literature. The prize was first awarded in 1984.

The award sum (as of 2022) is 30,000 euros (originally 100,000 Finnish Marks). Works submitted for nomination may be in Finnish or Swedish and also works in other languages may be considered. Prior to 2010 only works written by citizens of Finland were allowed but the rules were changed when Alexandra Salmela, a citizen of Slovakia, was nominated.

Since 1984, in addition to the fiction category, the Little Finlandia Prize for the best student essay on literature has been administered by the Finnish Language Teachers’ Union in cooperation with the Finnish Book Foundation.

Finlandia Prize in Fiction 
The Finlandia Prize in Fiction, the oldest of the three categories, has been awarded for an outstanding Finnish work of fiction since 1984. Since 1993, however, the prize has been awarded exclusively to novels.

Finlandia Prize in Children's and Youth Literature 
The Finlandia Prize in Children's and Youth Literature (formerly the Finlandia Junior Prize) is awarded for children's and youth literature.

Note: English title column may reflect a published book, or just a translated title.

Finlandia Prize in Non-Fiction 
The Finlandia Prize in Non-Fiction is considered Finland's most significant non-fiction award.

References

Finnish literary awards
Fiction awards
Non-fiction literary awards
Children's literary awards
Awards established in 1984
1984 establishments in Finland